Oprah Winfrey's endorsement of Senator Barack Obama was one of the most widely covered and studied developments of the 2008 presidential campaign, as she has been described as the most influential woman in the world.  Winfrey first endorsed Senator Obama in September 2006 before he had even declared himself a candidate.  In May 2007 Winfrey made her official endorsement of candidate Obama, and in December 2007, she made her first campaign appearances for him.  Two economists estimate that Winfrey's endorsement was worth over a million votes in the Democratic primary race and that without it, Obama would have received fewer votes. Then-Governor of Illinois Rod Blagojevich claimed that the endorsement was so significant in making Obama president-elect that he considered offering Obama's former seat in the Senate to Winfrey.

Winfrey's endorsement influence
Winfrey was at times called "arguably the world's most powerful woman" by CNN and Time.com, "arguably the most influential woman in the world" by The American Spectator, "one of the 100 people who most influenced the 20th century" and "one of the most influential people" of 2004, 2005, 2006, 2007, 2008, 2009, 2010 and 2011 by Time. Winfrey is the only person in the world to have made all nine lists.

At the end of the 20th century Life listed Winfrey as both the most influential woman and the most influential black person of her generation, and in a cover story profile the magazine called her "America's most powerful woman".
Ladies Home Journal also ranked Winfrey number one in their list of the most powerful women in America and then senator Barack Obama has said she "may be the most influential woman in the country". In 1998 Winfrey became the first woman and first African American to top Entertainment Weekly's list of the 101 most powerful people in the entertainment industry. In 2003 Winfrey edged out both Superman and Elvis Presley to be named the greatest pop culture icon of all time by VH1. Forbes named her the world's most powerful celebrity in 2005, 2007, and 2008. Columnist Maureen Dowd seems to agree with such assessments:

Vanity Fair wrote:

Bill O'Reilly said:

Biographer Kitty Kelley states that she has always been "fascinated" by Winfrey:

The power of Winfrey's endorsement has been most consistently measured by the spike in sales that products receive when she endorses them on her show, most notably, books selected for Oprah's Book Club.

Business Week stated:

The power of Winfrey's endorsement is also credited with making Dr. Phil, who got his start appearing on Winfrey's show, into a household name, hit talk show host, and the author of multiple best-sellers.

Endorsing Barack Obama
On September 25, 2006, Winfrey appeared on Larry King Live and was asked about a fan who started a campaign to get Winfrey to run for president. Larry King noted that Winfrey's lawyers had apparently warned the man to stop the campaign. Winfrey chided the lawyers and advised the fan to "take all your energy, and put it in Barack Obama". Winfrey explained that Obama was her favorite senator and she hoped he would run for president. Then, on October 19, 2006, Winfrey interviewed Obama and his wife Michelle on her show and reiterated the endorsement that she had previously made on Larry King, while promoting his book The Audacity of Hope. Winfrey explained that she would be on the air for several more years, so if he ever decided to run, she would hope he would announce it on her show. Obama's appearance on Oprah caused his book to reach the No. 1 spot on both Amazon.com's and the New York Times bestseller list. Immediately following Winfrey's two endorsements, Time magazine put Obama on their October 23, 2006 cover with the caption "Why Barack Obama could be the next president."

Obama eventually decided to announce his candidacy, not on The Oprah Winfrey Show, but at the steps of the Illinois state legislature. With Obama officially becoming a candidate for president in 2008, Winfrey decided not to interview him or any other candidate during the campaign because as a vocal Obama supporter, she noted that she may be unable to be objective.

In May 2007, Winfrey once again appeared on Larry King Live and was asked if her endorsement of Obama still applied. She replied "of course" and explained that what Obama stood for was worth her going out on a limb for. When King asked Winfrey if there was a woman side of her that would lean towards Obama's opponent, then front-runner Hillary Clinton, Winfrey explained that she had great respect for Senator Clinton, and that her endorsement of Obama did not imply that she was against anyone else.  After endorsing Obama, however, Oprah's ratings fell 7%.

In June 2008, when Obama secured the Democratic nomination, Winfrey told Entertainment Tonight:

In late August 2008, Winfrey attended the Democratic convention and reacted emotionally to Obama's speech, telling reporters "I've never experienced anything like that.  I cried my eyelashes off."  Elaborating further, Winfrey explained "I woke up this morning and I went to Google and I googled the entire Martin Luther King speech because like most Americans I, you know, you listen to the 'I Have a Dream' part. In the earlier part of the speech, he talks about the promise of democracy. And I think that today that promise was fulfilled in a way that I never imagined in my lifetime."  Winfrey also told reporters:

Fundraising
In the fall of 2007 Winfrey held a fundraiser for Obama at her California home and raised several million dollars.  In October 2008 Winfrey hosted a second fundraiser for Obama, this time in Chicago.

Campaign appearances

In the fall of 2007, Obama was considered a long shot, an absolute outsider in the race for the Democratic Party nomination for president of the United States and was still considered unlikely to win the Iowa caucus, and polls showed him losing the black vote to Clinton.  In late November 2007, the Obama campaign announced that Winfrey would be campaigning for Obama for a series of rallies in the early primary states of Iowa, New Hampshire, and South Carolina. Even before Winfrey appeared thousands of Iowans flocked to Obama's campaign offices, and 1,385 signed up as volunteers to score tickets to see Winfrey's Iowa appearance.  The Columbia, South Carolina event on December 9, 2007 drew a crowd of nearly 30,000, the largest for any political event of 2007.

Newsweek's Howard Fineman reviewed Winfrey's speech in South Carolina:

Impact

More than one million votes

Using a novel methodology, Craig Garthwaite and Tim Moore, economists at the University of Maryland, College Park concluded that Winfrey's endorsement of Obama not only netted him 1,015,559 votes in the Democratic primary alone (with a 95% confidence interval of 423,123 to 1,596,995) but decided the election. The researchers were not able to apply their methodology to all states however, so their estimate does not include any additional Oprah effect that may have emerged in Texas, Michigan, North Dakota, Kansas, or Alaska. "It does appear to have been a decisive, if not a deciding, factor," explained Garthwaite.

Garthwaite and Moore matched sales of Winfrey's "O" magazine and the spike in sales of her book club picks to Obama's votes in the Democratic primary. After controlling for a large range of confounding factors such as the fact that both Obama and Winfrey are popular with African Americans, Garthwaite and Moore showed that votes for Obama spiked in precisely the same geographic areas where Winfrey is the most popular. By applying the same methodology to Obama's 2004 Senate race, when he did not have Winfrey's endorsement, they found no relationship between Obama votes and Winfrey popularity in Illinois; the relationship only emerged after the endorsement, suggesting that Winfrey's endorsement had caused the spike in Obama's vote total in those counties.

Garthwaite and Moore also showed that the connection is not because people who read women's magazines preferred Obama to Clinton. Just the opposite, Obama  got less support where women's magazines such as Self and People are popular. After controlling for racial demographics, the economists also found no relationship between the popularity of Ebony magazine, whose readership is largely African American, and support for Obama.

In addition to getting Obama over a million votes, the researchers found that Winfrey's support boosted campaign contributions to him in those counties where she is most popular. They found that Winfrey's biggest effect was in caucus states like Iowa.

During the Democratic primary, there was controversy over which states should be counted in the popular vote total and not all states released official vote counts, but it's estimated that at most, Obama won the popular vote by 151,844 votes without counting Michigan's disputed votes. Clinton, however, won the popular vote by 176,645 votes when Michigan's numbers were included.

Increased viability
Another study suggests that Winfrey's endorsement may have also had indirect benefits for Obama. Researchers Andrew Pease and Paul R. Brewer of the University of Wisconsin–Milwaukee conducted an experiment in which some subjects were exposed to news of Winfrey's endorsement and others weren't. They found that those who had such exposure were more likely to vote for Obama, if only because they thought her endorsement made Obama more electable; for such voters Winfrey's endorsement was important for strategic reasons. The researchers concluded that when evaluating the impact of celebrity endorsements, one must also consider "subtler effects, such as those on viability assessments."

Polls
A CBS poll found that a third of all Americans claimed that most people they know would be more inclined to vote for Obama because of Winfrey's endorsement. A study by the Pew Research Center found that Winfrey's campaign appearances had dramatically increased Obama's visibility, especially among African-Americans.
One reason Winfrey's endorsement was useful in helping Obama compete with Senator Clinton was because as of December 2007 (when Winfrey first began campaigning) Winfrey was the one woman in the world more admired than Hillary Clinton among American women.

Political commentary
"There's no doubt that Oprah could tip a close presidential election if she strongly backed one candidate," predicted psychologist James Houran.
In the May 2007 issue of Newsmax, political analyst Dick Morris predicted Winfrey's endorsement would have an important impact:

When asked by Larry King if there was a "woman side" of Oprah that "would lean towards a Hillary" Winfrey replied:

Later Dick Morris would see significance in the fact that Winfrey campaigned for Obama in December, and Iowa voted right after Christmas:

"Because Oprah has such a reputation as a tastemaker, I think her early endorsement forced people to take Obama's candidacy seriously," explained Dr. Mark Anthony Neal, author, pop culture critic and Duke University professor. "It made Obama more than a 'Black' candidate. Also, given Oprah's championing of women's issues, her decision not to support Hillary (Clinton) struck a chord for early undecideds... Obama's people understood that much of the Black electorate in the South was made up of women, and Oprah's campaigning with the Obamas, particularly in South Carolina, helped give the campaign some momentum"

In April 2008, The New York Times editorial board wrote:

And Thomas Schaller noted:

Senate seat consideration
The then governor of Illinois reported being so impressed by Winfrey's influence on the election of Barack Obama that he considered offering Winfrey Obama's vacant senate seat. Governor Blagojevich summarized his reasons for considering Winfrey on various talk shows:

Winfrey responded to the disclosure with amusement, noting that although she was absolutely not interested, she did feel she could be a senator.

Political analyst Chris Matthews praised the idea of making Winfrey a senator suggesting that in one move it would diversify the senate and raise its collective IQ. Elaborating further he said:

Lynn Sweet of the Chicago Sun-Times agreed with Matthews, claiming Winfrey would be "terrific" and an "enormously popular pick."

Winfrey's potential presidential run 
Winfrey has been urged by many media figures to run in the 2020 presidential election, recalling her endorsement for Obama. Obama's successor, President Donald Trump, commented on her decision by stating, "She says she'll run only if she gets the go ahead from the Almighty," he said. "All right Oprah, go ahead and run."

References

Oprah Winfrey
2008 United States presidential election endorsements
Barack Obama 2008 presidential campaign
September 2006 events in the United States
May 2007 events in the United States
2006 in American television
2007 in American television